Events from the year 1658 in Sweden

Incumbents
 Monarch – Charles X Gustav

Events

 Battle of Kobron
 Battle of Tybrindvig
 February 6 – Swedish troops of Charles X Gustav of Sweden cross the Great Belt (Storebælt) in Denmark over frozen sea.
 February 26 – The peace between Sweden and Denmark is concluded in Roskilde by the Treaty of Roskilde, under which Denmark is forced to cede significant territory.
 Swedish occupation of Bornholm
 Armistice between Sweden and Russia
 Sweden declares war on Denmark.  
 Swedish occupation of Valmiera
 Sweden invades Denmark. 
 Swedish siege of Copenhagen
 Sweden invades Courland.
 Swedish occupation of Kronborg
 Swedish occupation of Marienburg
 Sweden invades Norway. 
 Swedish occupation of Courland
 Sweden takes Mitau and captures the Duke of Courland. 
 Sweden pillages Amager.
 Battle of the Sound; the siege of Copenhagen is over. 
 The end of the Swedish occupation of Jylland
 The end of the Swedish occupation of Als
 The end of the Swedish occupation of Bornholm
 The end of the Swedish occupation of Trondheim
 The end of the Swedish occupation of Thorn
 Herkules by Georg Stiernhielm
 Thet Swenska Språketz Klagemål by Skogekär Bergbo

Births

 Hedvig Eleonora Stenbock, courtier   (died 1714)

Deaths

 8 December - Johan Printzensköld, army officer   (born 1615) 
 Marketta Punasuomalainen, cunning woman and alleged witch  (born 1600)

References

 
Years of the 17th century in Sweden
Sweden